The Maidstone line is a railway line between Swanley, Maidstone and Ashford in Kent, England.

The line diverges from the Chatham Main Line at Swanley Junction and proceeds down the Darenth valley to Otford junction (where the Bat & Ball line divides towards ). It continues via Borough Green & Wrotham and Maidstone East to Ashford, where it joins the South Eastern Main Line.  In 2020 the line from Ashford International to Kemsing was adopted by the Kent Rail Partnership and this section was renamed The Kent Downs Line

History
The line was built by the London, Chatham and Dover Railway from their first line (the Chatham Main Line). Upon the creation of the South Eastern and Chatham Railway the original Ashford terminus was closed in 1899 and services diverted to the South Eastern Railway's Ashford station. The line was electrified in 1939 (750 V DC third rail) to Maidstone East by the Southern Railway prior to World War Two. Electrification between Maidstone East and Ashford was completed in 1961 under the BR 1955 Modernisation Plan.

Infrastructure
Traction current is supplied at 750 volts DC via the Third Rail. The supply for this is overseen by Paddock Wood Electrical Control Room. Signalling is Track Circuit Block with multiple aspect colour light signals throughout, controlled by Ashford IECC. The line is double track throughout.

Services
Services on the line are run by Southeastern.
Services run to London Victoria, London Charing Cross and Ashford, with some peak services to London Blackfriars.

In the off-peak, there are one train per hour from Ashford International to London Victoria via Bromley South and Swanley stopping at all stations between Ashford and Otford and one train per hour from Maidstone East to London Charing Cross running semi-fast via Swanley and London Bridge.  These services are operated by Class 375 and Class 377 EMUs.

Thameslink utilizes the route between Swanley and Otford on their London Blackfriars to Sevenoaks metro services via the Catford Loop and Elephant and Castle with two trains per hour running. Additional services through London will be introduced as part of the Thameslink Programme between Cambridge and Maidstone East. As of September 2019, these services have not yet been introduced with no news about its future.

References

Rail transport in Kent
Transport in the Borough of Ashford
Railway lines in South East England
Standard gauge railways in England